Abram Adrian 'Boan' Venter (born ) is a South African rugby union player for Edinburgh Rugby in the United Rugby Championship.

His regular position is prop.

Rugby career

Venter was born in Kimberley.

He made four appearances in that competition, and featured in all ten of their matches in the 2018 edition of the competition, as the team reached the semifinal of the competition before losing to Griquas.

Venter came on as a replacement in the 73rd minute of the match, and scored his side's final try in a 61–25 victory.

He now plays for Edinburgh in the URC and is one of many South African born players applying their trade in Europe, especially Scotland.

References

South African rugby union players
Living people
1997 births
Rugby union props
Cheetahs (rugby union) players
Free State Cheetahs players
Griffons (rugby union) players
Edinburgh Rugby players
Rugby union players from Kimberley, Northern Cape